Siphonaria gigas, common name the giant false limpet, is a species of air-breathing sea snail or false limpet, a marine pulmonate gastropod mollusc in the family Siphonariidae, the false limpets.

Description
The size of the shell varies between 32 mm and 84 mm.

Distribution
This marine species occurs off Acapulco, Mexico, to Northern Peru; off the Galápagos Islands.

References

 Dayrat, B.; Goulding, T. C.; White, T. R. (2014). Diversity of Indo-West Pacific Siphonaria (Mollusca: Gastropoda: Euthyneura). Zootaxa. 3779(2): 246-276

External links
 

Siphonariidae
Gastropods described in 1825